The Linfield Review is a weekly newspaper published by students at Linfield College in McMinnville, Oregon, United States. It is distributed free across campus. Subscriptions cost $35 per year.

Awards
Since 1999, The Linfield Review has won a number of awards in the Oregon Newspaper Publishers Association's Collegiate Newspaper Contest, among four-year college or university newspapers publishing weekly, bi-weekly, or monthly. In 2007, the paper earned twelve first-place awards and three second-place awards in that contest.

References

External links

Linfield University
1895 establishments in Oregon
McMinnville, Oregon
Oregon Newspaper Publishers Association
Publications established in 1895
Student newspapers published in Oregon